Third Finger, Left Hand is a 1940 American romantic comedy film directed by Robert Z. Leonard and starring Myrna Loy and Melvyn Douglas. The screenplay concerns a woman who pretends to be married to fend off would-be suitors and jealous wives, then regrets her deception when she meets an artist.

Plot
New York magazine editor Margot Sherwood "Merrick" (Myrna Loy) invents a husband (who is conveniently away in remote corners of the world) mainly to safeguard her job; the magazine publisher's jealous wife has had the last two women in her position fired after mere months. It also comes in handy keeping aggressive men at bay, as Margot is determined to succeed in her career. Magazine photographer August Winkel (Felix Bressart) helps by writing letters supposedly from "Tony Merrick".

One day, she goes to meet a friend arriving on a passenger ship. However, when she enters her friend's cabin, she finds some paintings, but no friend. Soon after, art dealer Mr. Flandrin (Donald Meek) shows up to examine the works. Irritated by Flandrin's brusk attitude and certain that she can get a better deal for her friend, Margot orders him to leave. However, Margot's friend had gotten off at a prior stop, and the paintings actually belong to Jeff Thompson (Melvyn Douglas). Jeff runs into Flandrin on deck, only to learn that the insulted dealer is no longer interested in selling his artwork.

When Jeff confronts Margot, she promises to straighten things out. Masquerading as an enthusiastic rival dealer, she manipulates Flandrin into offering Jeff a much better deal than he had ever expected. Mollified, Jeff offers to take her out to dinner to celebrate. She declines, but when her lawyer boyfriend Philip Booth (Lee Bowman) has to cancel their date, she changes her mind.

At the nightclub, a drunken acquaintance spots Margot and mentions her husband, forcing Margot to improvise and tell Jeff that it was merely a passing infatuation in Rio de Janeiro. He believes her at first, but then some inconsistencies in her story cause him to check up on her; he concludes that there is no Tony Merrick.

To teach her a lesson, he shows up at her family mansion and announces to her father (Raymond Walburn), younger sister (Bonita Granville), and butler (Halliwell Hobbes) that he is Tony. He is welcomed with open arms. Margot has no choice but to go along with the deception.

The next morning, she confesses all to Philip in order to get some legal advice.  Philip tells her she cannot "divorce" a man to whom she is not even married. He suggests she first marry him discreetly, then divorce him publicly. Philip convinces a reluctant Jeff to go along. The couple head off to Niagara Falls to get married. At the falls, Jeff runs into some friends from his Ohio hometown, Wapakoneta. Margot takes the opportunity to exact some revenge, pretending to be a very uncouth wife, complete with an exaggerated New York accent.

Margot, Jeff, and Philip then board a train to drop Jeff off in Ohio. Margot and Philip plan to go on to Reno to secure the divorce, then get married themselves. However, Jeff starts having second thoughts. To buy time, he hires African-American train porter Sam (who has been studying law by correspondence) to draw out the property settlement negotiations. It works. When Jeff gets off the train, Margot goes with him.

Cast
 Myrna Loy as Margot Sherwood Merrick
 Melvyn Douglas as Jeff Thompson
 Raymond Walburn as Mr. Sherwood
 Lee Bowman as Philip Booth
 Bonita Granville as Vicky Sherwood
 Felix Bressart as August Winkel
 Donald Meek as Mr. Flandrin
 Ann Morriss as Beth Hampshire
 Sidney Blackmer as Hughie Wheeler
 Ernest Whitman as Sam
 Halliwell Hobbes as Burton
 Jeff Corey as Minnesota newlywed (uncredited)

Reception
Bosley Crowther of The New York Times dismissed it as "a trifling but sometimes amusing distortion of life—and little more." Variety described the film as "sufficiently light and fluffy in its farcical setup to provide diverting entertainment."

References

External links

 
 
 

1940 films
1940 romantic comedy films
American black-and-white films
American romantic comedy films
Films directed by Robert Z. Leonard
Films scored by Daniele Amfitheatrof
Films set in New York (state)
Metro-Goldwyn-Mayer films
Films scored by Edward Ward (composer)
1940s English-language films
1940s American films